Khatia (literally "icon") is a feminine Georgian name. It may refer to:

Khatia Buniatishvili (born 1987), French-Georgian concert pianist
Khatia Dekanoidze (born 1977), Georgian politician and government minister
Khatia Moistsrapishvili, Georgian media and political figure 
Khatia Tchkonia, or Chkonia, (born 1989), Georgian female footballer 

Georgian feminine given names